The 130th Airlift Wing (130 AW) is a unit of the West Virginia Air National Guard, stationed at McLaughlin Air National Guard Base, Charleston, West Virginia. If activated to federal service, the Wing is gained by the United States Air Force Air Mobility Command.

Overview 
The 130th Airlift Wing provides tactical airlift in support of the United States Air Force and the State of West Virginia.

Units
The 130th Airlift Wing consists of the following units
 130th Operations Group
 130th Airlift Squadron
 167th Aeromedical Evacuation Squadron
 130th Maintenance Group
 130th Mission Support Group
 130th Medical Group

History
On 1 July 1960, the West Virginia Air National Guard 130th Troop Carrier Squadron was authorized to expand to a group level, and the 130th Air Commando Group was established by the National Guard Bureau. The 130th being re-designated as an Air Commando squadron and becoming the group's flying squadron. Other squadrons assigned into the group were the 130th Headquarters, 130th Material Squadron (Maintenance), 130th Combat Support Squadron, and the 130th USAF Dispensary.   Aircraft assigned to the new group were C-119 Flying Boxcars and U-10D Super Courier combat observation aircraft.   The mission of the 130th ACG was primarily Air Commando special operations missions.

Continuing its mission and training with the Active duty 1st Air Commando Group in Northern Florida, in 1968 HQ USAF directed all Air Commando organizations be re-designated as "Special Operations" units to be more descriptive of their mission.  Through the 1960s and into the 1970s the 130th participated in many international missions and received recognition for their performance. This included the 130th being awarded the Spaatz Trophy four times as the "Outstanding Flying Unit in the Country " and the Air Force Outstanding Unit Award five times.

In 1975, the Flying Boxcars were retired, the 130th receiving the far more capable C-130E Hercules transport, and being designated as a "Tactical Airlift" unit.  The transition to the C-130 moved the gaining organization from Tactical Air Command to Military Airlift Command, with the primary mission of the Group becoming tactical airlift, with the Special Operations mission becoming secondary with the end of the Vietnam War.

A model upgrade to the C-130H in 1986 was completed and in August and September 1990, the 130th TAG commanded a "volunteer" package of 16 C-130s and support personnel from WV, TN, TX, MO and DE ANG units in support of Operation Desert Shield.  October 1990 saw the Presidential Call of selected members from the 130th Tactical Airlift Squadron combining with the 181st Tactical Airlift Squadron, TX ANG to form the functional staff of the 1630th Tactical Airlift Squadron (Provisional) at Al Ain International Airport, Al Ain, United Arab Emirates. In December 1990, the 130th Tactical Clinic and the 130th Mobile Aerial Port Squadron had selective members activated. They deployed to RAF Bicester, UK and Dover AFB, Delaware respectively, subsequent to "Operation Desert Storm". All members were deactivated by June 1991. The members of the group located in the United Arab Emirates received the Air Force Outstanding Unit Award with valor.

In April 1992, some unit members and aircraft deployed to Rhein-Main AB, Germany in support of the Bosnian Airlift called "Operation Provide Promise". The 130th has deployed several times since this date for "Provide Promise", the latest being from 21 September 1998 to 29 October 1998. In August 1993, one aircraft and 2 crews were sent to Operation "Operation Support Hope" for 30 days in Rwanda, Africa.

Organizationally, the 130th was expanded to a Wing status in 1995.  From January to March 1996, the unit deployed 2 aircraft, 6 crews and maintenance support to Daharan, Saudi Arabia, in support of Operation Southern Watch.

As of mid-2000, the 130th AW had recently sent several aircraft and support personnel to Panama for Coronet Oak. While there, wing personnel were heavily involved in Hurricane Mitch relief to Honduras and Nicaragua.

On 8 Aug 2021, the wing commenced transition from the C-130H to the C-130J Super Hercules with the arrival of the first of an eventual eight C-130J-30 aircraft.

BRAC 2005
On 13 May 2005, the United States Department of Defense released its Base Realignment and Closure, 2005 (BRAC) report, and the 130th Airlift Wing was one of the units slated to be eventually decommissioned. Its complement of eight C-130H aircraft would be transferred to Pope Air Force Base, and its complement of expeditionary combat support (ECS) personnel to the 167th Airlift Wing.

Upon learning of this, several former commanders of the 130th Airlift Wing along with members of the local Kanawha County Commission and the Yeager Airport Board of Directors and formed the Keep 'Em Flying grassroots organization to try to prevent the unit from being decommissioned. Following an outpouring of community support, money was raised for newspaper and radio ads and to hire analysts familiar with BRAC, all in an attempt to save the unit. Funds were contributed from Yeager Airport, the Kanawha County Commission and the local economic development organization, the Charleston Area Alliance.  On 13 June 2005, members of the BRAC commission came to Charleston to evaluate the base and talk to General Tackett, Governor Joe Manchin, Senator Robert Byrd, Congresswoman Shelley Moore Capito and Col Bill Peters Jr, former commander of the 130th and chair for Keep 'Em Flying.

Following this visit, and taking in all the information that was presented to them during that time, the BRAC commission voted unanimously, 9–0, to keep the unit intact.

Notable achievements
Being the first Air Guard unit to deploy outside the United States, February 1965.
First Air Guard unit to participate in "Operation Bright Star" near Cairo, Egypt in 1981.
Only Air Guard unit to participate in the 40th anniversary of D-Day, held in France in 1984.
First unit to combine with the active force for an ORI inspection in 1987.
Aug 1990 – Headed volunteer package 1630th TAS(P) during Desert Shield.  Based at Al Ain Air Base, UAE the 1630 flew missions to every country in the Southwest Asia AOR.
Oct 1990 – Members of the 130th Tactical Airlift Squadron and 130th Maintenance Squadron were activated by Presidential Order and joined other members of the 1630th TAS(P) already in place for Desert Shield.
Nov 1990 – The 130th Tactical Clinic was activated by Presidential Order and sent to England to head up a hospital for war casualties.
Dec 1990 – 130th Mobile Aerial Port activated by Presidential Order and sent to Dover AFB, DE in support of Desert Shield and Desert Storm.
Jan 1991 – Desert Storm – Several members of the 1630th Tactical Airlift Squadron (Provisional) and aircraft deployed to King Fahd AB, KSA, in support of the air portion of Operation Desert Storm.  The unit moved more cargo and troops (weight) in 12 days than in the entire Berlin Airlift.
April 1991 – Unit returned home
April 1992 –  Some unit members and aircraft deployed to Rhein-Main Air Base, Germany in support of the Bosnian Airlift, Operation "Provide Promise".  The 130th has deployed several times since this date for "Provide Promise", the latest being 21 Sept 98 to 29 Oct 98.
Aug 1993 – One aircraft and 2 crews were sent to Operation Support Hope for 30 days in Rwanda, Africa.
Jan–Mar 1996 – Unit deployed 2 aircraft, 6 crews and maintenance support to D'haran, KSA in support of Operation Southern Watch.
Apr–Jun 1998 – Support of Operation Southern Watch from Prince Sultan Air Base, KSA.

Lineage
 Designated 130th Air Commando Group and allotted to West Virginia ANG in 1960
 Extended federal recognition on 1 July 1960
 Re-designated: 130th Special Operations Group, 1 July 1968
 Re-designated: 130th Tactical Airlift Group, 1 July 1975
 Re-designated: 130th Airlift Group, 16 March 1992
 Status changed from Group to Wing, 1 October 1995
 Re-designated: 130th Airlift Wing''', 1 October 1995

Assignments
 West Virginia Air National Guard, 1 July 1960
 Gained by: Tactical Air Command
 Gained by: Military Airlift Command, 1 July 1975
 Gained by: Air Mobility Command, 1 June 1992
 Gained by: Air Combat Command, 1 October 1993
 Gained by: Air Mobility Command, 1 October 1997 – Present

Components
 130th Operations Group, 1 October 1995 – Present
 130th Air Commando (Later, Special Tactical Airlift, Airlift), Squadron, 1 July 1960 – Present

Stations
Yeager Airport Charleston, West Virginia, 1 October 1955
 Designated: McLaughlin Air National Guard Base, 1991–Present

Aircraft
 C-119 Flying Boxcar, 1960–1975
 U-10D Super Courier, 1960–1975
 C-130E Hercules, 1975–1986
 C-130H Hercules, 1986-2021
C-130J Super Hercules, 2021–Present

Decorations
 Air Force Outstanding Unit Award

References

 130th Airlift Wing website history
 130th Airlift Wing@globalsecurity.org
 Rogers, B. (2006). United States Air Force Unit Designations Since 1978.

External links
http://www.globalsecurity.org/cgi-bin/texis.cgi/webinator/search/?pr=default&order=r&query=130th+Airlift+Wing+&submit=Submit
http://modernamerica.blogspot.com/2005/06/honorable-senator-byrd.html - Keep'em Flying Article on Efforts to Keep the 130th
130th Airlift Wing

Wings of the United States Air National Guard
Military units and formations in West Virginia
0130
1955 establishments in West Virginia
West Virginia Air National Guard